Central is a Belo Horizonte Metro station on Line 1. It was opened in April 1987 as a one-station extension of the line from Lagoinha. In April 1992 the line was extended to Santa Efigênia. The station is located between Lagoinha and Santa Efigênia.

References

Belo Horizonte Metro stations
1987 establishments in Brazil
Railway stations opened in 1987